Hasanabad-e Baqeraf (also Romanized as Ḩasanābād-e Bāqerāf, Hāsanābād-e Bāqerof, and Ḩasanābād-e Bāqer of; also known as Towḩīd and Dehkadeh-ye Towḩīd) is a village in Aftab Rural District, Aftab District, Tehran County, Tehran Province, Iran. At the 2006 census, its population was 531, in 134 families.

References 

Populated places in Tehran County